Maryland's Legislative District 3 is one of 47 districts in the state for the Maryland General Assembly. It covers part of Frederick County. Up until the 2020 United States redistricting cycle, the district was divided into two sub-districts for the Maryland House of Delegates: District 3A and District 3B.

Demographic characteristics
As of the 2020 United States census, the district had a population of 143,766, of whom 110,187 (76.6%) were of voting age. The racial makeup of the district was 84,892 (59.0%) White, 22,308 (15.5%) African American, 809 (0.6%) Native American, 8,652 (6.0%) Asian, 53 (0.0%) Pacific Islander, 11,644 (8.1%) from some other race, and 15,341 (10.7%) from two or more races. Hispanic or Latino of any race were 23,875 (16.6%) of the population.

The district had 93,691 registered voters as of October 17, 2020, of whom 21,788 (23.3%) were registered as unaffiliated, 27,442 (29.3%) were registered as Republicans, 43,356 (46.3%) were registered as Democrats, and 425 (0.5%) were registered to other parties.

Political representation
The district is represented for the 2023–2027 legislative term in the State Senate by Karen Lewis Young (D) and in the House of Delegates by Kris Fair (D), Karen Simpson (D) and Kenneth P. Kerr (D).

References

Frederick County, Maryland
03